The Man of Gold may refer to:

 Man of Gold (film), a 1919 Hungarian silent film
 The Man of Gold (film), a 1962 Hungarian film
 The Man of Gold (novel), Tékumel novel by M. A. R. Barker